Vinne is a village in the municipality of Verdal in Trøndelag county, Norway. Vinne is also a parish covering the southern part of western Verdal municipality, with Vinne Church located in this village. The Bergsgrav Station is a train stop in Vinne along the Nordlandsbanen railway line.

References

Verdal
Villages in Trøndelag